Anthony Butt is a driver of standardbred racehorses in New Zealand. He was associated with champions trotters Lyell Creek and Take A Moment, who, along with many other of his best drives, were trained by his brother Tim. He has won the Dominion Handicap eight times and has been inducted into the Inter Dominion Hall of Fame.

He can be considered a champion driver, and has partnered with his brother Tim for many of those wins. He and his brother Roddy were the first drivers to win the New Zealand Junior Drivers Series twice, his brother winning it consecutively.

See also
 Harness racing in New Zealand
 Harness racing in Australia

Reference list

Year of birth missing (living people)
Living people
New Zealand harness racers
New Zealand Trotting Cup winners
Dominion Handicap winners
Inter Dominion winners